The Warsaw Voivodeship, between 1975 and 1990 known as the Warsaw Capital Voivodeship, was a voivodeship (province) of the Polish People's Republic from 1975 to 1989, and the Third Republic of Poland from 1989 to 1998. Its capital was Warsaw, and it was located in the central Masovia. It was established on 1 June 1975, from the part of the Warsaw Voivodeship, and a city voivodeship of Warsaw, and existed until 31 December 1998, when it was incorporated into then-established Masovian Voivodeship.Ustawa z dnia 24 lipca 1998 r. o wprowadzeniu zasadniczego trójstopniowego podziału terytorialnego państwa (Dz.U. z 1998 r. nr 96, poz. 603).

History 
The Warsaw Capital Voivodeship was established on 1 June 1975, as part of the administrative reform, and was one of the voivodeships (provinces) of the Polish People's Republic. It was formed from the part of the territory of the Warsaw Voivodeship, and a city voivodeship of Warsaw, which became its capital. In 1975, it was inhabited by 2 154 700 people.

On 9 December 1989, the Polish People's Republic was replaced by the Third Republic of Poland. In 1990, its name had been changed to Warsaw Voivodeship. In 1997, it had a population of 2 418 400, and an area of 3788 km². It existed until 31 December 1998, when it was incorporated into then-established Masovian Voivodeship.

Subdivisions 

In 1997, the voivodeship was divided into 58 gminas (municipalities), including 25 urban municipalities, 14 urban-rural municipalities, and 20 rural municipalities. It had 28 towns and cities.

From 1990 to 1998, it was additionally divided into 7 district offices, each composing of the several municipalities.

Demographics

Population

Major cities 
The biggest cities and towns, by the population in 1995, were:
 Warsaw (1,638,300);
 Pruszków (53,000);
 Legionowo (50,600);
 Otwock (44,000);
 Wołomin (36,500);
 Nowy Dwór Mazowiecki (27,200);
 Piaseczno (25,200);
 Grodzisk Mazowiecki (24,900);
 Piastów (23,700).

Leaders 
The leader of the administrative division was a voivode. From 1975 to 1990, the mayor of Warsaw held the office of the voivode. The people holding the office over the years were:
 1975–1982: Jerzy Majewski
 1982–1986: Mieczysław Dębicki
 1986–1990: Jerzy Bolesławski
 1990: Stanisław Wyganowski
 1990: Adam Langer
 1990–1997: Bohdan Jastrzębski
 1997–1998: Maciej Gielecki

Citations

Notes

References 

History of Warsaw
History of Masovia
Former voivodeships of Poland (1975–1998)
States and territories established in 1975
States and territories disestablished in 1998
1975 establishments in Poland
1998 disestablishments in Poland